With the ship Geo Barents, Doctors Without Borders (MSF) returned to sea-rescue of refugees in the Mediterranean in June 2021. This is the seventh year in which MSF personnel have operated at sea in the Mediterranean, and Geo Barents is the sixth humanitarian ship on which they have worked.

Technical 
Geo Barents was built in 2007 as a geological research vessel. MSF have chartered the vessel, which has been adapted for search and rescue, from Uksnøy & Co AS. The ship is 76.95 meters long, and has two accommodation sections for rescued people, one for men, the other for women and children. The vessel has facilities for MSF teams to carry out medical assistance activities. The ship can deploy two fast Rigid inflatable boats during rescue operations, and is operated by 20 MSF personnel together with typically 12 crew for maritime operations. Geo Barents sails under the Norwegian flag.

Operations 
After sailing from Alesund in Norway on 13 May 2021, on 10 June 2021 during the first of the ship's operations MSF made their first rescue of refugees from the sea. By 14 June 2021, there were 400 aboard, who were disembarked at Augusta, Sicily on 18 June.

See also 
 List of ships for the rescue of refugees in the Mediterranean Sea

References 

European migrant crisis
Immigrant rights activism
Humanitarian aid organizations in Europe
Refugee aid organizations in Europe